

15001–15100 

|-
| 15001 Fuzhou ||  || Fuzhou, the capital of Fujian Province, P.R. China. || 
|-id=003
| 15003 Midori ||  || Midori Gotō (born 1971), an extremely talented violinist, and she has also contributed much to musical education for children. || 
|-id=004
| 15004 Vallerani ||  || Ernesto Vallerani (born 1936) has participated in numerous important European and international scientific programs, notably playing a key role in space activities in Italy's Piedmont region. || 
|-id=005
| 15005 Guerriero ||  || Luciano Guerriero (born 1930) played a key role in the development of the first Italian National Space Program and the promotion of important international space research missions in astronomy. || 
|-id=006
| 15006 Samcristoforetti ||  || Samantha Cristoforetti (born 1977), the first Italian female astronaut. || 
|-id=007
| 15007 Edoardopozio || 1998 NA || Edoardo Pozio (born 1952), Italian biologist and researcher in the field of zoonotic parasitic diseases at the Istituto Superiore di Sanità in Rome. He serves as director of the European Commission's Community Reference Laboratory of Parasites. || 
|-id=008
| 15008 Delahodde ||  || Catherine E. Delahodde (born 1974), French astronomer and recoverer of several comets at ESO's La Silla Observatory || 
|-id=014
| 15014 Annagekker ||  || Anna Gekker (born 1985), 2003 Intel STS finalist. She attended the Brooklyn Technical High School, Brooklyn, New York. || 
|-id=017
| 15017 Cuppy ||  || Will Cuppy (1884–1949), American humorist and journalist. A gentle satirist, he is well known for his books The Decline and Fall of Practically Everybody, How to Attract the Wombat, How to Become Extinct and How to Tell Your Friends from the Apes. The name was suggested by M. Walter. || 
|-id=019
| 15019 Gingold ||  || Julian A. Gingold (born 1985), 2003 Intel STS finalist. He attended the New Rochelle High School, New Rochelle, New York. || 
|-id=020
| 15020 Brandonimber ||  || Brandon Stuart Imber (born 1985), 2003 Intel STS finalist. He attended the Commack High School, Commack, New York. || 
|-id=021
| 15021 Alexkardon ||  || Alex Kardon (born 1985), 2003 Intel STS finalist. He attended the South Side High School, Rockville Centre, New York. || 
|-id=023
| 15023 Ketover ||  || Daniel Jacob Ketover (born 1985), 2003 Intel STS finalist. He attended the Syosset High School, Syosset, New York. || 
|-id=025
| 15025 Uwontario ||  || University of Western Ontario is located in London, Canada, and was founded in 1878. The Hume Cronyn Memorial Observatory was built on campus in 1940, and the university has a 1.2-m telescope at the Elginfield Observatory. The name was suggested by R. Jedicke and P. Jedicke. || 
|-id=026
| 15026 Davidscott ||  || David Holcomb Scott (1916–2000) was a member of the USGS lunar geologic mapping team during the Apollo program, the senior author of the USGS geologic map of Mars based on the Mariner 9 data, and the coordinator for the preparation of the Mars Geologic Atlas. || 
|-id=028
| 15028 Soushiyou ||  || Soushiyoukouen is a park on a hill located in the northern part of Nanyo-city, Yamagata prefecture in Japan. This park is known for pine wood, cherry trees, roses, chrysanthemums and the Nanyo Citizen Observatory || 
|-id=030
| 15030 Matthewkroll ||  || Matthew Jay Kroll (born 1985), 2003 Intel STS finalist. He attended the Byram Hills High School, Armonk, New York. || 
|-id=031
| 15031 Lemus ||  || Bryan A. Lemus (born 1985), 2003 Intel STS finalist. He attended the Dr. Michael M. Krop High School, Miami, Florida. || 
|-id=032
| 15032 Alexlevin ||  || Alex Levin (born 1985), 2003 Intel STS finalist. He attended the Stuyvesant High School, New York, New York. || 
|-id=034
| 15034 Décines || 1998 WH || The French town of Décines-Charpieu, west of Lione. The town is twinned with Monsummano Terme, Italy, the birthplace of Luciano Tesi, the co-discoverer of this minor planet. || 
|-id=036
| 15036 Giovannianselmi ||  || Giovanni Anselmi, editor of the Italian astronomy journal Coelum || 
|-id=037
| 15037 Chassagne ||  || Robin Chassagne (born 1962), a discoverer of minor planets and supernovae || 
|-id=041
| 15041 Paperetti ||  || Emiliano Paperetti (born 1951), Italian amateur astronomer from Pistoia, Tuscany || 
|-id=042
| 15042 Anndavgui ||  || Annick Merlin (born 1953), David Merlin (born 1985), and Guillaume Merlin (born 1989), wife and sons of the discoverer Jean-Claude Merlin, respectively || 
|-id=045
| 15045 Walesdymond ||  || William Wales (1734–1798) and his assistant Joseph Dymond (1746–1796), British astronomers sent to the shores of Hudson Bay by the Royal Society of London to observe the transit of Venus in 1769 Src || 
|-id=050
| 15050 Heddal ||  || Heddal, a small school located in and named after the a small village of Heddal in southern Norway. || 
|-id=052
| 15052 Emileschweitzer ||  || Emile Schweitzer (born 1923) was for 25 years president of the Association Françoise des Etoiles Variables. || 
|-id=053
| 15053 Bochníček ||  || Záviš Bochníček (1920–2002), Czech astronomer who worked at the Comenius University in Bratislava, Slovakia || 
|-id=056
| 15056 Barbaradixon ||  || Barbara Dixon, software developer and engineer. This minor planet was discovered by David S. Dixon. || 
|-id=057
| 15057 Whitson ||  || Peggy Whitson (born 1960), American astronaut and biochemist || 
|-id=058
| 15058 Billcooke ||  || Bill Cooke (born 1958), American space weather scientist who generates custom meteor activity forecasts || 
|-id=068
| 15068 Wiegert ||  || Paul Wiegert (born 1967), Canadian astrodynamicist and discoverer of minor planets. He studied at Simon Fraser University, University of Toronto, York University and Queen's University. Wiegert helped identify 3753 Cruithne as the first minor planet known to be co-orbital with the Earth. The name was suggested by R. Jedicke and P. Jedicke. || 
|-id=071
| 15071 Hallerstein ||  || Ferdinand Augustin Hallerstein (1703–1774), Slovenian Jesuit missionary to China, mathematician, astronomer, cartograph, and diplomat || 
|-id=072
| 15072 Landolt ||  || Arlo U. Landolt (born 1935), a secretary of the American Astronomical Society and Professor at Louisiana State University. He has established the widely used Landolt Photometric Standard Stars through four decades of meticulous observations. || 
|-id=076
| 15076 Joellewis ||  || Joel Brewster Lewis (born 1984), 2003 Intel STS finalist. He attended the Stuyvesant High School, New York, New York. || 
|-id=077
| 15077 Edyalge || 1999 CA || Edy Alge (born 1934), a Swiss amateur astronomer from Widnau who has built many homemade telescopes of various sizes and spent most of his time expressing enthusiasm for the science of astronomy. || 
|-id=083
| 15083 Tianhuili ||  || Tianhui Michael Li (born 1985), 2003 Intel STS finalist. He attended the Oregon Episcopal School, Portland, Oregon. || 
|-id=088
| 15088 Licitra ||  || Jeffrey Lawrence Licitra (born 1985), 2003 Intel STS finalist. He attended the Blind Brook High School, Rye Brook, New York. || 
|-id=091
| 15091 Howell ||  || Steve B. Howell (born 1955), a student of cataclysmic variable stars, master of high-precision photometry and explorer of TOADs (tremendous outburst amplitude dwarf novae). He is equally at home developing theoretical stellar models, working with the latest instrumentation or mentoring students in esoteric astrophysics. || 
|-id=092
| 15092 Beegees ||  || The Bee Gees' UK-born recording artists Barry, Robin, Maurice, and Andy Gibb were raised in Australia only 100 km from the discovery site. || 
|-id=093
| 15093 Lestermackey ||  || Lester Wayne Mackey (born 1985), 2003 Intel STS finalist. He attended the Half Hollow Hills High School West, Dix Hills, New York. || 
|-id=094
| 15094 Polymele ||  || Polymele from Greek mythology; wife of Menoetius and the mother of Patroclus || 
|-id=099
| 15099 Janestrohm ||  || Jane Strohm, 2001 DYSC mentor. Strohm is a teacher at the Pistor Middle School, Tucson, Arizona. || 
|}

15101–15200 

|-id=106
| 15106 Swanson ||  || Marie Swanson, 2001 DYSC mentor. Strohm is a teacher at the Pistor Middle School, Tucson, Arizona. || 
|-id=107
| 15107 Toepperwein ||  || Mary Anne J. Toepperwein, 2001 DYSC mentor. Toepperwein is a teacher at the William P. Hobby Middle School, San Antonio, Texas. || 
|-id=109
| 15109 Wilber ||  || Harold T. Wilber, 2001 DYSC mentor. Wilber is a teacher at the Franklin Middle School, Springfield, Illinois. || 
|-id=111
| 15111 Winters ||  || Marlene K. Winters, 2001 DYSC mentor. Winters is a teacher at the International Montessori School, Venice, Florida. || 
|-id=112
| 15112 Arlenewolfe ||  || Arlene E. Wolfe, 2001 DYSC mentor. Wolfe is a teacher at the Venerini Academy, Worcester, Massachusetts. || 
|-id=115
| 15115 Yvonneroe ||  || Yvonne Roe (born 1935), wife of discoverer James M. Roe || 
|-id=116
| 15116 Jaytate ||  || Jonathan Tate (born 1955), an enthusiastic advocate of the search for hazardous near-Earth objects (NEOs) and founder of Spaceguard-UK and the Spaceguard Centre in Wales, UK. || 
|-id=118
| 15118 Elizabethsears ||  || Elizabeth R. Sears, 2001 DYSC finalist. Elizabeth was a student at the All Saints Episcopal School, Lubbock, Texas. || 
|-id=120
| 15120 Mariafélix || 2000 ES || Maria Jesús Albors Félix (born 1965) is the wife of the discoverer J. J. Gómez. This naming is in acknowledgment of her support, patience and understanding in accommodating the discoverer's work in observing minor planets. || 
|-id=126
| 15126 Brittanyanderson ||  || Brittany L. Anderson, 2001 DYSC finalist. Brittany was a student at the House Junior High School, House, New Mexico. || 
|-id=128
| 15128 Patrickjones ||  || Patrick K. Jones, 2001 DYSC finalist. Patrick was a student at the St. Michael Parish School, Wheeling, West Virginia. || 
|-id=129
| 15129 Sparks ||  || Branson Sparks, 2001 DYSC finalist and named 2001 Nation's Top Young Scientist. Branson was a student at the Alexandria Country Day School, Alexandria, Louisiana. || 
|-id=131
| 15131 Alanalda ||  || Alan Alda (born 1936) is an American actor, director, screenwriter and author. Best known as Benjamin Franklin "Hawkeye" Pierce in the TV series M.A.S.H. Alda has won numerous awards for his work including 6 Emmys and 6 Golden Globes. Alda hosted the acclaimed PBS series Scientific American Frontiers from 1993 to 2005 || 
|-id=132
| 15132 Steigmeyer ||  || August J. Steigmeyer, 2001 DYSC finalist. August was a student at the Canterbury School, Ft. Wayne, Indiana. || 
|-id=133
| 15133 Sullivan ||  || Cole J. Sullivan, 2001 DYSC finalist. Cole was a student at the Oslo Middle School, Vero Beach, Florida. || 
|-id=139
| 15139 Connormcarty ||  || Connor W. McCarty, 2001 DYSC finalist. Connor was a student at the Mesa Union Junior High School, Somis, California. || 
|-id=144
| 15144 Araas ||  || Michael J. Araas, 2001 DYSC finalist. Michael was a student at the Holy Name School, Sheridan, Wyoming. || 
|-id=145
| 15145 Ritageorge ||  || Rita M. George, 2001 DYSC finalist. Rita was a student at the Manhattan Beach Middle School, Manhattan Beach, California. || 
|-id=146
| 15146 Halpov ||  || Harold R. Povenmire (born 1939), American amateur astronomer and meteor observer has extensively searched the Georgia strewn field in an effort to find tektites and understand their complicated geology. He recently published the book Tektites: A Cosmic Enigma. He has also been an avid observer of grazing lunar occultations and of occultations by minor planets. || 
|-id=147
| 15147 Siegfried ||  || Ray M. Siegfried (born 1943) is active in numerous civic, business, cultural and community associations. || 
|-id=148
| 15148 Michaelmaryott ||  || Michael Maryott (1936–2009) was the owner of a company that maintains research microscopes for laboratories at the University of Arizona, especially the Lunar and Planetary Laboratory. He was a prospector, silversmith, photographer, craftsman, musician, scientist, educator and Arizona historian || 
|-id=149
| 15149 Loufaix ||  || Louis Faix (1933–2011), an amateur astronomer originally from the Detroit area in Michigan, retired to Saddlebrooke, Arizona. || 
|-id=150
| 15150 Salsa ||  || The San Antonio League of Sidewalk Astronomers, is an astronomy club whose passionate members are dedicated to sharing the night sky with everyone in a fun and friendly environment || 
|-id=151
| 15151 Wilmacherup ||  || Wilma Cherup (1915–2010), of the Amateur Astronomers' Association of Pittsburgh, became The Astronomical League's Executive Secretary in 1954. || 
|-id=155
| 15155 Ahn ||  || Ryan J. Ahn, 2001 DYSC finalist. Ryan was a student at the Landisville Middle School, Landisville, Pennsylvania. || 
|-id=160
| 15160 Wygoda ||  || Jennifer A. Wygoda, 2001 DYSC finalist. Jennifer was a student at the F. K. White Middle School, Lake Charles, Louisiana. || 
|-id=168
| 15168 Marijnfranx || 2022 P-L || Marijn Franx (born 1960), Dutch astronomer at Leiden. His research interests are very-high-redshift galaxies, which he observed with the Hubble Space Telescope. In 2010 he received the Dutch Spinoza Prize. || 
|-id=169
| 15169 Wilfriedboland || 2629 P-L || Wilfried Boland (born 1953), a Dutch astronomer at Leiden. Having studied in Utrecht, he obtained his PhD on molecular clouds in Amsterdam. After working in the Astron directorate (Dutch radio astronomy), he later became the executive director of the Dutch Research School for Astronomy. || 
|-id=170
| 15170 Erikdeul || 2648 P-L || Erik Deul (born 1958), Dutch astronomer, who, after a career in IT support, returned to Leiden to become Scientific Head of the Informations and Communications Technologies development group. || 
|-id=171
| 15171 Xandertielens || 2772 P-L || Alexander Tielens (born 1953), Dutch astronomer at Leiden who after his PhD went to the US to become Project Scientist for the airborne observatory, SOFIA. Back in the Netherlands he continues his work on dust and the chemistry of interstellar matter. || 
|-id=199
| 15199 Rodnyanskaya || 1974 SE || Larisa Zinov'evna Rodnyanskaya (1938–2004) was secretary of the board of the Ukrainian Filmmakers Union. In 1987 she founded the first independent documentary studio "Contact" and was its permanent director and producer || 
|}

15201–15300 

|-id=202
| 15202 Yamada-Houkoku ||  || Yamada-Houkoku (1805–1877) was a Confucian and Japanese scholar of the late Edo period, born in Okayama prefecture || 
|-id=203
| 15203 Grishanin ||  || Kirill Vladimirovich Grishanin (1909–2002), an eminent Russian specialist in the field of hydrometeorology, delivered lectures at the St. Petersburg State University for Water Communications for nearly 50 years. He is author of numerous scientific works and some textbooks, one of which was reprinted three times || 
|-id=212
| 15212 Yaroslavlʹ ||  || Founded in 1010, Yaroslavlʹ was the capital of an independent principality, incorporated into the Moscow principality in 1463. During the Polish occupation of Moscow in 1612 it was Russia's de facto capital. The historical center of Yaroslavlʹ has been included in the UNESCO list of World Heritage Sites || 
|-id=220
| 15220 Sumerkin ||  || Yurij Vasil'evich Sumerkin (born 1935) is a Russian scientist in the field of ship mechanical engineering, ship building and ship repair. He is an author of more than 100 scientific and educational works, including eight textbooks on the technology of ship mechanical engineering. || 
|-id=224
| 15224 Penttilä || 1985 JG || Antti Penttilä (born 1977), a postdoctoral researcher at the University of Helsinki. He is a specialist on the scattering and absorption of light by cosmic dust in cometary comae as well as on the surfaces of asteroids and cometary nuclei. || 
|-id=228
| 15228 Ronmiller || 1987 DG || Ron Miller (born 1955), a forester for the Bureau of Indian Affairs. || 
|-id=230
| 15230 Alona ||  || Alona (born 1997) is a daughter of Valentina Arkadievna Andreichenko, who performed the reductions for astrometric measurements by the discoverer and served as translator for the Tomsk-Uccle Observational Program. || 
|-id=231
| 15231 Ehdita ||  || Ehdita Stanislavovna P'ekha (born 1937), a Russian singer. || 
|-id=238
| 15238 Hisaohori || 1989 CQ || Hisao Hori (born 1968) was born in Niihama City, Ehime prefecture, He is an amateur astronomer and member of Shikoku Astronomical Society. He works for Anan Science Center and observes with its 1.13-meter reflector || 
|-id=239
| 15239 Stenhammar ||  || Wilhelm Stenhammar (1871–1927) was a Swedish composer, conductor and pianist. His work includes two piano concertos, two symphonies and several quartets. His Sensommarnätter ("Late Summer Nights", 1900–1904) includes beautiful episodes of quiet gestures that are sprinkled throughout the piece. || 
|-id=246
| 15246 Kumeta ||  || Yasutaka Kumeta (born 1965) is a well known Japanese amateur astronomer and keen observer and photographer of comets, nebulae, star clusters and lunar eclipses. He has been a member of the Kuroishi Subaru Association since 1992 || 
|-id=248
| 15248 Hidekazu ||  || Hidekazu Yamato (born 1956), became interested in astronomy through an event in which he participated at the age of 26. Star-field photography is his personal favorite activity || 
|-id=249
| 15249 Capodimonte ||  || Capodimonte is the name of the astronomical observatory near Naples that was inaugurated in early November 1819. || 
|-id=250
| 15250 Nishiyamahiro || 1990 DZ || Hiroshi Nishiyama (born 1962) has been a director of the Baienno Sato Observatory since 1998. He was previously a teacher of earth sciences in a high school. His interests include observations of various galaxies, searching for supernovae and astronomical teaching || 
|-id=252
| 15252 Yoshiken ||  || Kenichi Yoshioka (born 1948), a primary school principal. He joined the staff of Geisei Observatory in 2008 and is involved in astronomy education for children. || 
|-id=258
| 15258 Alfilipenko ||  || Aleksandr Vasil'evich Filipenko (born 1950), a civil engineer at Khanty-Mansijsk in Siberia. || 
|-id=262
| 15262 Abderhalden ||  || Emil Abderhalden (1877–1950), was a Swiss physiologist who lectured at the University of Halle during 1911–1945. He contributed more than 1000 articles to the physiologic chemistry of metabolism, created the basis of modern dietetics, discovered the defensive enzymes against exogenous proteins and promoted social welfare. || 
|-id=263
| 15263 Erwingroten ||  || Erwin Groten (born 1935), a pioneer in modern geodesy. For three decades until his retirement in 2003 he served as director of the Institute of Physical Geodesy at the Technical University in Darmstadt. He contributed significantly to the definition of fundamental astronomical and geodetic reference frames. || 
|-id=264
| 15264 Delbrück ||  || Max Delbrück (1906–1981), German biologist, joint winner with Salvador Luria and Alfred Hershey of the Nobel Prize for Physiology in 1969. || 
|-id=265
| 15265 Ernsting ||  || Walter Ernsting (1920–2005; pen name Clark Darlton), was a German science fiction writer who founded the German Science Fiction Club in 1955. His novels are characterized by his desire for humanity and peace. || 
|-id=267
| 15267 Kolyma ||  || The Kolyma, a river in northeastern Siberia, has a total length of 2129 km. It rises in the mountains north of the coast of Okhotsk and the Magadan area. Each winter the river is frozen to a depth of several meters || 
|-id=268
| 15268 Wendelinefroger ||  || Wendeline Froger (born 1948) has a beautiful soprano voice and a preference for singing Schubert's Lieder. Educated as a professional singer, she performs regularly at church celebrations, weddings and for select audiences at her residence || 
|-id=273
| 15273 Ruhmkorff ||  || Heinrich Daniel Ruhmkorff (1803–1877) was a German instrument maker and researcher who invented the Ruhmkorff coil, used in many physical experiments where high voltages are needed. The coil was applied for energizing discharge tubes, notably for generating x-rays. || 
|-id=276
| 15276 Diebel ||  || John Diebel (born 1943), a lifelong amateur astronomer and telescope enthusiast. || 
|-id=278
| 15278 Pâquet ||  || Paul Pâquet (born 1937) has contributed to earth-rotation studies and interpretation of the earth rotation variations in relation to the atmosphere and solar activity. As director of the Royal Observatory of Belgium from 1990 to 2002, he increased the number of scientists and renovated and enlarged the center. || 
|-id=282
| 15282 Franzmarc ||  || Franz Marc (1880–1916), a German expressionist painter and graphic artist who created an individual style, especially with animal representations. He invented geometrized and rhythmically arranged image composition. He co-founded the group Der Blaue Reiter in Munich in 1911. The name was suggested by the first discoverer. || 
|-id=294
| 15294 Underwood ||  || Lynn Underwood (born 1949), an American building plans examiner of Vail, Arizona, has completed successful and innovative designs of two major extensions to the Jarnac Observatory, thus enabling it to redouble its observations and join in an expanded public observing program with Dean Koenig and "Starizona". || 
|-id=295
| 15295 Tante Riek ||  || Helena T. Kuipers-Rietberg ("Tante Riek", 1893–1944) was one of the founders of the Dutch resistance organization "Landelijke organisatie voor hulp aan Onderduikers", which helped to hide Jews and escaped prisoners of war during World War II. She was betrayed and died in the concentration camp Ravensbrück || 
|-id=296
| 15296 Tantetruus ||  || Geertruida ("Truus") Wijsmuller-Meijer (1896–1978) was a member of the Dutch resistance who rescued some ten thousand Jewish children before and during WWII and smuggled them to safety. In 1966 she was named Righteous Among the Nations. Name suggested by W. A. Fröger || 
|}

15301–15400 

|-
| 15301 Marutesser ||  || Marianne Ute Esser, a member of the scientific staff of the Astronomisches Rechen-Institut in Heidelberg for more than 30 years. || 
|-id=303
| 15303 Hatoyamamachi ||  || Hatoyamamachi, a town in Saitama within the Tokyo metropolitan area. || 
|-id=304
| 15304 Wikberg ||  || Leonard Wikberg III (born 1959), a well-known planetary animator and the creator of extraordinary space images. || 
|-id=316
| 15316 Okagakimachi ||  || Okagakimachi is a small town in Fukuoka Prefecture, west Japan, where the Hokuto Sichisei (the Big Dipper) appears to dip into the Sea of Genkai at lower culmination in the early morning during the summer and autumn. || 
|-id=318
| 15318 Innsbruck ||  || Innsbruck, capital of Tyrol in the heart of the Alps on the great route from Italy. || 
|-id=321
| 15321 Donnadean ||  || With his wife Donna, Dean Koenig (born 1956) has devoted years to inspiring people to become interested in the night sky. Through observing sessions and other facilities of his store "Starizona", located in Tucson, Arizona, Koenig has a fine record of restoring and repairing telescopes. || 
|-id=329
| 15329 Sabena ||  || Sabena, defunct Belgian airline || 
|-id=330
| 15330 de Almeida || 1993 TO || Amaury Augusto de Almeida (born 1946) is a Brazilian astronomer with expertise in cometary science and astrochemistry. His major contributions include studies of gas and dust production in comets and theoretical determination of basic molecular data for simple radicals and ions of astrophysical importance. || 
|-id=332
| 15332 CERN ||  || CERN (originally the Conseil européen pour la recherche nucléaire; now the Organisation européenne pour la recherche nucléaire, European Organization for Nuclear Physics), Geneva, Switzerland, the world's largest subatomic particle laboratory. || 
|-id=335
| 15335 Satoyukie || 1993 UV || Yukie Sato (born 1962) is an expert on astronomical photography and one of the most active members of the Ota Astronomical Club. || 
|-id=338
| 15338 Dufault ||  || Michele Dufault (1988–2011), an outstanding astronomy and physics student at Yale College who died in an accident just weeks before graduation. || 
|-id=339
| 15339 Pierazzo ||  || Elisabetta Pierazzo (1963–2011) was an expert in impact modeling, in particular of the Chicxulub impact, as well as in modeling the effects of impacts on Earth and Mars. || 
|-id=342
| 15342 Assisi ||  || Saint Francis of Assisi || 
|-id=346
| 15346 Bonifatius ||  || Saint Boniface || 
|-id=347
| 15347 Colinstuart || 1994 UD || Colin Stuart (born 1986) is a British astronomy writer and presenter. He has given public astronomy talks to over 250,000 people in schools and at the Royal Observatory Greenwich, written many popular astronomy articles and space books. In 2014 he was runner up in the European Astronomy Journalism Prize. || 
|-id=350
| 15350 Naganuma ||  || Naganuma, Hokkaido. || 
|-id=351
| 15351 Yamaguchimamoru ||  || Mamoru Yamaguchi (born 1965), an amateur astronomer in Isahaya City, Nagasaki Prefecture, Japan. || 
|-id=353
| 15353 Meucci || 1994 WA || Antonio Meucci (1808–1889), an inventor of the telephone. || 
|-id=355
| 15355 Maupassant ||  || Guy de Maupassant (1850–1893), a French writer || 
|-id=358
| 15358 Kintner ||  || Paul Kintner (1946–2010), professor of electrical and computer engineering at Cornell University. || 
|-id=359
| 15359 Dressler ||  || Burkhard Dressler (born 1939), a Canadian geologist. || 
|-id=360
| 15360 Moncalvo ||  || Moncalvo is a small town in the Monferrato Hills region of Piedmont, a land of ancient and noble traditions. In addition to its renowned gastronomical specialties, Moncalvo has been a sponsor of cultural-scientific initiatives in astronomy and space exploration || 
|-id=363
| 15363 Ysaye ||  || Eugène Ysaÿe (1858–1931), a violinist and composer. || 
|-id=364
| 15364 Kenglover ||  || Ken Glover (born 1964), a Canadian space historian. || 
|-id=368
| 15368 Katsuji || 1996 JZ || Katsuji Koyama (born 1945), a professor emeritus of Kyoto University, works in x-ray astronomy and cosmic ray physics. In particular, he has investigated the x-ray emission mechanisms and structures of supernova remnants. He was a vice-president of the Astronomical Society of Japan during 1999–2000 || 
|-id=370
| 15370 Kanchi || 1996 NW || Kanji Nagao, whose nickname is Kanchi, is the hero in Tokyo Love Story, originally a cartoon written by Fumi Saimon, and broadcast as a TV drama in 1991. || 
|-id=371
| 15371 Steward ||  || Steward Observatory || 
|-id=372
| 15372 Agrigento ||  || The Italian city of Agrigento in Sicily. It was founded by the Greeks in 582 B.C. (Akragas)  One of the leading cities of the Mediterranean world, it demonstrates still its pride by preserving the remains of several Doric temples. In 490 B.C. the great philosopher Empedocles was born there. || 
|-id=374
| 15374 Teta || 1997 BG || Teta, mythical fortune-teller and heathen priestess, second daughter of Bohemian prince Krok || 
|-id=375
| 15375 Laetitiafoglia ||  || Laetitia Foglia (born 2003), the elder daughter of Sergio and Paola Diomede, friends of the discoverers. || 
|-id=376
| 15376 Marták ||  || Ján Marták, Slovak musician || 
|-id=378
| 15378 Artin ||  || Emil Artin, an Austrian-German mathematician. || 
|-id=379
| 15379 Alefranz ||  || Alessandro Besentini and Francesco Villa, Italian comedian duo, friends of the second discoverer || 
|-id=381
| 15381 Spadolini ||  || Mauro (1941) and Barbara (1944) Spadolini, dedicated Italian secondary-school teachers who believe in cross-curricular work. || 
|-id=382
| 15382 Vian || 1997 SN || Boris Vian (1920–1959), French writer (L´ecume des jours, L´arrache-coeur), singer (Le déserteur) and jazz musician. || 
|-id=384
| 15384 Samková ||  || Filomena Samková, Czech || 
|-id=385
| 15385 Dallolmo ||  || Umberto Dall'Olmo (1925–1980) was an Italian amateur astronomer with degrees in both law and physics, who principally observed Jupiter and studied flare stars with Rosino. He was also interested in the history of astronomy and worked as a technician at the University of Bologna's Institute of Astronomy. || 
|-id=386
| 15386 Nicolini ||  || Martino Nicolini, a nuclear engineer, is very active in amateur astronomy. || 
|-id=387
| 15387 Hanazukayama ||  || Hanazukayama is a 918-m mountain situated along the border between Kawamata town and Iitate village in Fukushima prefecture. It is officially recognized as the most northerly mountain from which Mt. Fuji is visible: 308 km away. || 
|-id=388
| 15388 Coelum ||  || Coelum, the Italian astronomy journal. Established in 1931 by Guido Horn d´Arturo, it was edited by the department of astronomy of the University of Bologna and had more than 4000 subscribers. The magazine ceased publications in 1986. The citation was prepared by F. Bonoli. || 
|-id=389
| 15389 Geflorsch ||  || Gérard Florsch, one of the founders of the Groupe de Lorraine of the Société Astronomique de France and of the public observatory of Sarreguemines. || 
|-id=390
| 15390 Znojil ||  || Vladimír Znojil, Czech astronomer || 
|-id=391
| 15391 Steliomancinelli ||  || Stelio Mancinelli Degli Esposti (1931–2017) was a professor of chemistry in Terni. Deeply keen on mathematics, physics and astronomy, he designed and implemented large sundials in various Italian cities. He was well known for giving lectures about the history of astronomy and for training courses for teachers. || 
|-id=392
| 15392 Budějický ||  || Jaromír Budějický, Czech radio-astronomer || 
|-id=395
| 15395 Rükl || 1997 UV || Antonín Rükl, Czech astronomer || 
|-id=396
| 15396 Howardmoore ||  || Howard Moore (born 1943) of Chino Valley, Arizona, is an amateur astronomer and accomplished optician who made the 0.25-m telescope with which this minor planet was discovered. || 
|-id=397
| 15397 Ksoari ||  || KSO-ARI Minor Planet Surveys (†) were conducted by Freimut Börngen (Karl Schwarzschild Observatory, Tautenburg) and Lutz D. Schmadel (Astronomisches Rechen-Institut, Heidelberg) with the Tautenburg Schmidt Telescope between 1990 and 1993. The surveys resulted in the discovery of 501 minor planets. || 
|-id=399
| 15399 Hudec || 1997 VE || René Hudec, Czech astronomer || 
|}

15401–15500 

|-id=402
| 15402 Suzaku ||  || Suzaku, an imaginary vermilion bird that guards the south of Kyoto. || 
|-id=403
| 15403 Merignac ||  || Merignac, the city in southwestern France. || 
|-id=406
| 15406 Bleibtreu ||  || Hermann Karl Bleibtreu (born 1933), professor emeritus of anthropology at the University of Arizona. || 
|-id=407
| 15407 Udakiyoo ||  || Kiyoo Uda (1959–2009) was a potter at Shigaraki-ware and an amateur astronomer. He observed meteors, variable stars and occultations enthusiastically and made great contributions to astronomical popularization in Shiga prefecture || 
|-id=412
| 15412 Schaefer ||  || John P. Schaefer (born 1934), founder, in association with Ansel Adams, of the Center for Creative Photography of the University of Arizona. || 
|-id=413
| 15413 Beaglehole ||  || J.C. Beaglehole (1901–1971), a New Zealand historian and authority on the European exploration of the Pacific. || 
|-id=414
| 15414 Pettirossi ||  || Silvio Pettirossi (1887–1917), a Paraguayan aviation pioneer and first president of the Aeroclub del Paraguay. || 
|-id=415
| 15415 Rika ||  || Rika Akana, girlfriend of Kanchi, is the heroine in Tokyo Love Story. Some stories of the TV drama were filmed on location in Kuma Town, where this minor planet was discovered. || 
|-id=417
| 15417 Babylon ||  || Babylon, one of the most famous cities of antiquity, was the capital of southern Mesopotamia, the region between the Tigris and Euphrates rivers. || 
|-id=418
| 15418 Sergiospinelli ||  || Sergio Spinelli (born 1939), a very active volunteer promoting both music and astronomy in Italy. || 
|-id=420
| 15420 Aedouglass ||  || A. E. Douglass (1867–1962) was an American astronomer and developer of dendochronology. For Percival Lowell, he sited Lowell Observatory. Later he directed the Steward Observatory at the University of Arizona and in 1923 dedicated the 0.9-m telescope, which became the Spacewatch telescope in 1983. || 
|-id=421
| 15421 Adammalin ||  || Adam Mikah Malin, 2003 Intel STS finalist. || 
|-id=425
| 15425 Welzl ||  || Jan Welzl, Czech arctic explorer || 
|-id=427
| 15427 Shabas ||  || Natalia Leonydivna Shabas (1969–2003), a Ukrainian astronomer at Kyiv Shevchenko National University. || 
|-id=434
| 15434 Mittal ||  || Alexander Chow Mittal, 2003 Intel STS finalist. || 
|-id=436
| 15436 Dexius ||  || Dexius was the father of Iphinous. || 
|-id=438
| 15438 Joegotobed ||  || Joseph Gotobed, network operations manager for the Lunar and Planetary Lab at the University of Arizona. || 
|-id=440
| 15440 Eioneus ||  || Eioneus, from Greek mythology. He was killed by a spear from Hector. || 
|-id=448
| 15448 Siegwarth ||  || James David Siegwarth (born 1934), a physicist at the National Institute of Standards and Technology in Boulder. || 
|-id=452
| 15452 Ibramohammed ||  || Ibraheem Maqsood Mohammed, 2003 Intel STS finalist. || 
|-id=453
| 15453 Brasileirinhos ||  || Brasileirinhos ("Young Brazilians") was chosen by the winners of the third Grande Desafío organized by the Museu Exploratorio de Ciencias of the Universidade Estadual de Campinas to encourage all Brazilian students in their efforts to achieve the necessary goals in their studies || 
|-id=460
| 15460 Manca ||  || Francesco Manca, Italian amateur astronomer || 
|-id=461
| 15461 Johnbird ||  || John M. Bird (born 1931) is a professor of geology at Cornell University. He is a pioneer in the geological interpretation of plate-tectonic motions and of deep-earth mineralogy. The name was suggested by P. C. Thomas. || 
|-id=462
| 15462 Stumegan ||  || Stewart A. Megan (born 1952) discovered the Near Earth Object 2004 BV18 in conjunction with the Spacewatch Fast-Moving-Object Project. This find, made using real-time images transferred to volunteers over the Internet, encouraged others to join the online search. || 
|-id=465
| 15465 Buchroeder ||  || Richard Alfred Buchroeder (born 1941) is an American designer of decentered and other innovative optical systems, including those for astronomical telescopes. Three wide-field correctors used on the Spacewatch telescopes are of his design.† || 
|-id=466
| 15466 Barlow ||  || Nadine G. Barlow (born 1958), a planetary geoscientist at Northern Arizona University, studies planetary surface feature geology. || 
|-id=467
| 15467 Aflorsch ||  || Alphonse Florsch (1930–2015) a French astronomer who was the director of the Observatoire de Strasbourg for many years. A specialist in radial velocities in the Small Magellanic Cloud, he was also secretary of the Groupe d´Alsace of the Société Astronomique de France for 20 years. Now retired, he still continues to teach astronomy in schools (Src). || 
|-id=468
| 15468 Mondriaan ||  || Pieter C. Mondriaan (1872–1944), a Dutch Neo-plasticist painter || 
|-id=469
| 15469 Ohmura || 1999 BC || Tsutomu Ohmura (born 1965), a computer engineer and amateur astronomer. || 
|-id=476
| 15476 Narendra ||  || Varun Kumar Narendra, 2003 Intel STS finalist. || 
|-id=492
| 15492 Nyberg ||  || Michael Herbert Nyberg, 2003 Intel STS finalist. || 
|-id=495
| 15495 Bogie ||  || Humphrey Bogart (1899–1957), an American actor who appeared on Broadway and was the star of many a Hollywood film. Often cast in the tough-guy role, Bogart won the Academy Award for best actor in 1951 and was voted male star of the twentieth century by the American Film Institute in 1999 || 
|-id=497
| 15497 Lucca ||  || Lucca, the ancient city on the banks of the river Serchio, in Tuscany. || 
|-id=499
| 15499 Cloyd ||  || Marshall P. Cloyd (born 1939), a businessman and philanthropist, has provided assistance to organizations in the U.S. and U.K. to preserve historical items and artifacts, and he has encouraged public exhibitions for naval, aeronautic and space programs. The name was suggested by E. K. Gibson and F. Vilas. || 
|-id=500
| 15500 Anantpatel ||  || Anant Ramesh Patel, 2003 Intel STS finalist. || 
|}

15501–15600 

|-
| 15501 Pepawlowski ||  || Peter Michal Pawlowski, 2003 Intel STS finalist. || 
|-id=506
| 15506 Preygel ||  || Anatoly Preygel, 2003 Intel STS finalist. || 
|-id=507
| 15507 Rengarajan ||  || Michelle Rengarajan, 2003 Intel STS finalist. || 
|-id=510
| 15510 Phoeberounds ||  || Phoebe Robeson Rounds, 2003 Intel STS finalist. || 
|-id=512
| 15512 Snyder ||  || Doug Snyder, an American amateur astronomer whose untiring work has reduced or prevented much light pollution in southern Arizona, and his educational efforts have introduced many to astronomy. He co-discovered Comet C/2002 E2 (Snyder-Murakami). || 
|-id=513
| 15513 Emmermann ||  || Axel Emmermann (born 1953), a Belgian amateur geologist who was the only person to alert U.S. authorities of an international e-mail sale offering of lunar material. His actions resulted in the recovery of stolen Apollo lunar rock samples and the arrest and conviction of four individuals for the theft (see Sex on the Moon). The name was suggested by E. K. Gibson. || 
|-id=522
| 15522 Trueblood ||  || Mark Trueblood, American engineer and amateur astronomer. || 
|-id=523
| 15523 Grenville ||  || Grenville Turner, a geochronologist and meteoriticist. || 
|-id=526
| 15526 Kokura ||  || Kokura high school is in Kitakyushu City, Fukuoka Prefecture, Japan. || 
|-id=530
| 15530 Kuber ||  || Catharine M. Kuber, 2001 DYSC finalist. || 
|-id=543
| 15543 Elizateel ||  || Elizabeth A. Teel, 2001 DYSC finalist. || 
|-id=548
| 15548 Kalinowski ||  || Larry Kalinowski (1930–2007), a long time amateur astronomer with the Warren Astronomical Society of Detroit, Michigan, United States. || 
|-id=550
| 15550 Sydney ||  || Australia's largest city, Sydney is also the birthplace of the discoverer of this minor planet. || 
|-id=551
| 15551 Paddock ||  || George (born 1918) and Courtney (born 1914) Paddock have retained a decades-long, educated interest in astronomy, planetary sciences and both human and robotic exploration of space. || 
|-id=552
| 15552 Sandashounkan ||  || Sandashounkan high school is in Sanda City, Hyoko Prefecture, Japan. || 
|-id=553
| 15553 Carachang ||  || Cara A. Chang, 2001 DYSC finalist. || 
|-id=557
| 15557 Kimcochran || 2000 GV || While working for the Spacewatch Project, Kim Cochran (born 1977) showed exceptional talent and creativity at applying new computer technologies during the design and construction of upgraded cameras for the Spacewatch 0.9-m and 1.8-m telescopes. || 
|-id=559
| 15559 Abigailhines ||  || Abigail M. Hines, 2001 DYSC finalist. || 
|-id=563
| 15563 Remsberg ||  || Jarrett R. Remsberg, 2001 DYSC finalist. || 
|-id=565
| 15565 Benjaminsteele ||  || Benjamin C. Steele, 2001 DYSC finalist. || 
|-id=566
| 15566 Elizabethbaker ||  || Elizabeth A. Baker, 2001 DYSC finalist. || 
|-id=567
| 15567 Giacomelli ||  || Hillary N. Giacomelli, 2001 DYSC finalist. || 
|-id=569
| 15569 Feinberg ||  || Rebecca M. Feinberg, 2001 DYSC finalist. || 
|-id=574
| 15574 Stephaniehass ||  || Stephanie A. Hass, 2001 DYSC finalist. || 
|-id=576
| 15576 Munday ||  || Emily S. Munday, 2001 DYSC finalist. || 
|-id=577
| 15577 Gywilliams ||  || Genevieve Y. Williams, 2001 DYSC finalist. || 
|-id=582
| 15582 Russellburrows ||  || Russell T. Burrows, 2001 DYSC finalist. || 
|-id=583
| 15583 Hanick ||  || Andrea L. Hanick, 2001 DYSC finalist. || 
|-id=594
| 15594 Castillo ||  || Jesse L. Castillo, 2001 DYSC finalist. || 
|-id=599
| 15599 Richardlarson ||  || Richard W. Larson, 2001 DYSC finalist. || 
|}

15601–15700 

|-id=604
| 15604 Fruits ||  || Benjamin R. Fruits, 2001 DYSC finalist. || 
|-id=606
| 15606 Winer ||  || Irvin M. Winer (1935–1982), a physicist, teacher and mentor. || 
|-id=608
| 15608 Owens ||  || Alexander C. Owens, 2001 DYSC finalist. || 
|-id=609
| 15609 Kosmaczewski ||  || Named in 2002 after Sara Kosmaczewski, a Hamden student, after she won the third annual Discovery Young Scientist Challenge, a national science contest. || 
|-id=614
| 15614 Pillinger ||  || Colin T. Pillinger (born 1943), a planetary geochemist. || 
|-id=617
| 15617 Fallowfield ||  || Heather L. Fallowfield, 2001 DYSC finalist. || 
|-id=618
| 15618 Lorifritz ||  || Lori A. Fritz, 2001 DYSC finalist. || 
|-id=619
| 15619 Albertwu ||  || Albert Y. Wu, 2001 DYSC finalist. || 
|-id=620
| 15620 Beltrami ||  || Eugenio Beltrami (1835–1900), an Italian mathematician. || 
|-id=621
| 15621 Erikhovland ||  || rik Hovland (born 1970), a computer programmer at the Jet Propulsion Laboratory. || 
|-id=622
| 15622 Westrich ||  || Bradford J. Westrich, 2001 DYSC finalist. || 
|-id=624
| 15624 Lamberton ||  || Melissa L. Lamberton, 2001 DYSC finalist. || 
|-id=627
| 15627 Hong ||  || Danny Hong, 2001 DYSC finalist. || 
|-id=628
| 15628 Gonzales ||  || Eric A. Gonzales, 2001 DYSC finalist. || 
|-id=629
| 15629 Sriner ||  || Kimberly A. Sriner, 2001 DYSC finalist. || 
|-id=630
| 15630 Disanti ||  || Michael A. DiSanti (born 1954) has advanced the understanding of molecular processing and chemistry in comets, in particular of carbon monoxide and oxygen-processing mechanisms, through his studies at the Goddard Space Flight Center. || 
|-id=631
| 15631 Dellorusso ||  || Neil Dello Russo (born 1966) has advanced the understanding of molecular processing and chemistry in comets, in particular of ethane and water, through his studies at the Catholic University of America and Goddard Space Flight Center. || 
|-id=632
| 15632 Magee-Sauer ||  || Karen P. Magee-Sauer (born 1961), an American astronomer who has advanced the understanding of the chemistry of HCN and acetylene in comets through her studies at Rowan University. || 
|-id=635
| 15635 Andrewhager ||  || Andrew T. Hager, 2001 DYSC finalist. || 
|-id=651
| 15651 Tlepolemos || 9612 P-L || Tlepolemos, king of Rhodes, son of Heracles and was one of the first kings to join the army against Troy. || 
|-id=663
| 15663 Periphas || 4168 T-2 || The Greek hero Periphas from Aetolia was killed by the god Ares. Ares tried to get the armor of Periphas, but Diomedes wounded Ares, with the help of Pallas Athene. || 
|-id=669
| 15669 Pshenichner ||  || Boris Grigor'evich Pshenichner (born 1933) dealt with space education for 50 years. Since 1958 he worked in the Moscow planetarium, and since 1962 in the Moscow palace for children's creativity. A member of the Russian space academy, he is head of the Moscow scientific-educational program "Experiment in Space" || 
|-id=671
| 15671 Suzannedébarbat ||  || Suzanne V. Débarbat (born 1928), an astronomer of the Observatory of the Paris. She contributed to the development of the Danjon-Astrolabe and wrote La méthode des hauteurs égales en astronomie. She was the president of IAU Commission 41 from 1991 to 1994 (IAU). || 
|-id=672
| 15672 Sato-Norio ||  || Sato-Norio (Norio Sato, 1865–1942), a Japanese educator in the Meiji period, was born in Okayama prefecture. || 
|-id=673
| 15673 Chetaev ||  || Nikolaj Gur'evich Chetaev (1902–1959), a Soviet mathematician and mechanician and a professor at the universities in Kazan and Moscow. || 
|-id=674
| 15674 Elfving ||  || Ulf Elfving (born 1942), a Swedish journalist and broadcaster who received the Stora Journalistpriset (Swedish Grand Prize for Journalism) in 1989. || 
|-id=675
| 15675 Goloseevo ||  || The Goloseevo district in Kiev where the Main Astronomical Observatory of the Ukrainian National Academy of Sciences is located. || 
|-id=676
| 15676 Almoisheev ||  || Alexandr Alexandrovich Moisheev (born 1943) was a designer of the space observatory ASTRON that successfully operated during 1983–1989. As deputy designer general of the Lavochkin Association he significantly contributed to the implementation of a series of Soviet and Russian space missions to Mars and Venus || 
|-id=691
| 15691 Maslov ||  || Vladimir Anatol'evich Maslov (born 1965), an engineer in Simferopol and an inventor in the area of storage and transport of oil, is a friend of the discoverer's family. || 
|-id=695
| 15695 Fedorshpig ||  || Fedor Ivanovich Shpig (born 1955), a qualified specialist in economical sciences, is the president of the amateur football association in Ukraine. He promotes the development of sport and a healthy life-style among teenagers in Ukraine. || 
|-id=699
| 15699 Lyytinen ||  || Esko Lyytinen (born 1942), a Finnish amateur astronomer. || 
|}

15701–15800 

|-id=702
| 15702 Olegkotov ||  || Oleg Kotov (born 1965), a Russian cosmonaut and physician. He took part in training the crews for the space station Mir. || 
|-id=703
| 15703 Yrjölä ||  || Ilkka Yrjölä (born 1959), a long-term dedicated amateur astronomer in Kuusankoski, Finland || 
|-id=705
| 15705 Hautot ||  || Antoine Hautot (1909–1998) was the discoverer's physics professor at the University of Liège. He did seminal work on the study of the photographic process and on the foundations of subatomic physics. The name was suggested by C. Sterken || 
|-id=710
| 15710 Böcklin ||  || Arnold Böcklin (1827–1901), a Swiss painter || 
|-id=716
| 15716 Narahara ||  || Hiroshi Narahara, Japanese coach for the Chunichi Dragons baseball team, and a friend of the first discoverer. || 
|-id=718
| 15718 Imokawa ||  || Satoshi Imokawa (born 1965) is an astronomy instructor at the public astronomical observatory Hoshino Bunkakan in Yame city, Fukuoka prefecture. His main interests are observing comets, nebulae, star clusters and solar eclipse. || 
|-id=723
| 15723 Girraween ||  || Girraween National Park, Queensland, Australia. || 
|-id=724
| 15724 Zille ||  || Heinrich Zille (1858–1929), graphic artist and photographer. || 
|-id=727
| 15727 Ianmorison ||  || Ian Morison (born 1943), a radio astronomer at the University of Manchester's Jodrell Bank Observatory. || 
|-id=728
| 15728 Karlmay ||  || Karl May (1842–1912), Saxonian author of splendid fantasies. || 
|-id=729
| 15729 Yumikoitahana || 1990 UB || Yumiko Itahana (born 1965), who worked together with Japanese astronomer Atsushi Takahashi (first discoverer), and greatly influenced his astronomical career. || 
|-id=732
| 15732 Vitusbering ||  || Vitus Bering, Danish navigator and explorer || 
|-id=735
| 15735 Andakerkhoven ||  || Melisande Kerkhoven (1919–1945), a Dutch medical student at Groningen University, active in the Dutch Resistance during World War II || 
|-id=736
| 15736 Hamanasu || 1990 XN || Hamanasu, the name of a Japanese rose, is also the name of a sleeper train that connects Aomori and Sapporo (a 480-km distance) in 7.5 hours. Hamanasu is the only sleeper express train that passes through Seikan, the longest tunnel in the world. The train will be retired in the spring of 2016. || 
|-id=739
| 15739 Matsukuma || 1991 ER || Takehiko Matsukuma (1890–1950), an astronomer. || 
|-id=740
| 15740 Hyakumangoku ||  || Japanese for the « one million koku domain », the nickname of the wealthy Kaga han (Kaga Province) in the Edo period || 
|-id=742
| 15742 Laurabassi ||  || Laura Bassi (1711–1778) was the first woman to receive a philosophical degree in physics at a European university (Bologna). Not allowed to teach, she gave lectures on physics and performed experimental demonstrations, based on Newton's Principia, at her home. Name suggested by K. Leterme. || 
|-id=745
| 15745 Yuliya ||  || Yuliya Germanova (born 1986), studied English and Chinese at the Ural University in Chelyabinsk. During the 2013 "First International Conference on the Chelyabinsk/Chebarkul Meteor/Meteorite", she did live Russian translations of the discoverer's talk, as well as live English translations of Russian talks. || 
|-id=752
| 15752 Eluard ||  || Paul Éluard, 20th-century French surrealist poet. || 
|-id=760
| 15760 Albion ||  || Albion is the island-dwelling primordial man who divided himself into the Four Zoas (Urthona, Urizen, Luvah and Tharmas), in the creation mythology of William Blake (1757–1827). Each Zoa represents important aspects of human character. || 
|-id=761
| 15761 Schumi ||  || German ace Michael ("Schumi") Schumacher (born 1969) is recognized as being among the world's best racing drivers. || 
|-id=762
| 15762 Rühmann ||  || Heinz Rühmann, German actor. || 
|-id=763
| 15763 Nagakubo ||  || Nagakubo Sekisui (1717–1801), a Japanese geographer and Confucian scholar. || 
|-id=766
| 15766 Strahlenberg ||  || Philip Johan von Strahlenberg, Swedish officer and geographer || 
|-id=779
| 15779 Scottroberts ||  || Scott Roberts (born 1959) for many years has encouraged amateur astronomers to pursue their love of the night sky, spending much time teaching people how to use and enjoy their telescopes. || 
|-id=783
| 15783 Briancox ||  || Brian Edward Cox (born 1968), an English particle physicist. || 
|-id=785
| 15785 de Villegas ||  || Esteban Manuel de Villegas (1585–1669), a Spanish poet, became famous for his lyrical work Las Eréoticas (1618), setting with its purely formal poetry a precedent for neoclassism. The naming honors also Jean-Baptiste de Villegas (1721–1806), a member of the Gezelschap van den Heiligen Bloede in Bruges || 
|-id=790
| 15790 Keizan || 1993 TC || Keizan Zenji (1268–1325), a Japanese priest who practiced asceticism at the Eiheiji Temple in Fukui prefecture. He contributed to the spread of Zen Buddhism by founding several temples including the Sojiji Temple in 1321. || 
|-id=791
| 15791 Yoshiewatanabe ||  || Yoshie Watanabe (born 1963) is a Japanese writer for popular Japanese astronomy magazines. She has published, with her husband Junichi, several popular books on astronomy and general science. || 
|}

15801–15900 

|-id=803
| 15803 Parisi || 1994 CW || Giorgio Parisi (born 1948), an Italian theoretical physicist, who was awareded with the 2021 Nobel Prize in Physics  "for the discovery of the interplay of disorder and fluctuations in physical systems from atomic to planetary scales". || 
|-id=804
| 15804 Yenisei ||  || Yenisei river, flowing from near the Mongolian border to eventually join the Kara Sea || 
|-id=805
| 15805 Murakamitakehiko ||  || Takehiko Murakami (born 1956) is a well-known amateur astronomer in Kanagawa Prefecture. || 
|-id=806
| 15806 Kohei ||  || Kohei Mori (born 1956), an amateur astronomer and junior high school teacher. || 
|-id=808
| 15808 Zelter ||  || Composer Carl Friedrich Zelter (1758–1834) set Goethe's poems to music and wrote songs for male choirs. As director of the Berliner "Singakademie" beginning in 1800, he performed in particular the music of Bach. He founded in Berlin the first "Liedertafel", the prototype for choral societies in cities and towns around the world. || 
|-id=810
| 15810 Arawn ||  || The Middle Welsh Pedair Cainc Y Mabinogi (Four Branches of the Mabinogi) describes Arawn as the ruler of the Celtic otherworld, Annwn. || 
|-id=811
| 15811 Nüsslein-Volhard ||  || Christiane Nüsslein-Volhard (born 1942), a German biologist who intensely studied the development stages of the fly Drosophila melanogaster and shared the 1995 Nobel prize for medicine for her epoch-making discoveries of the fundamental genetic steering mechanisms of embryogeny. || 
|-id=817
| 15817 Lucianotesi || 1994 QC || Luciano Tesi, Italian amateur astronomer || 
|-id=818
| 15818 DeVeny ||  || James B. ("Jim") DeVeny (1943–2004), born in Alliance, Ohio, joined the staff of Kitt Peak National Observatory in 1967 and became leader of the Instrument Support Group, playing a major role in the success and development of the observatory for more than 30 years. || 
|-id=819
| 15819 Alisterling ||  || Alister Ling (born 1962) is a meteorologist with Environment Canada. || 
|-id=821
| 15821 Iijimatatsushi ||  || Tatsushi Iijima (1963–2015) was a journalist who worked at Kyodo News for about 28 years. He was a professional photographer who loved motorbikes. He supported the Japanese space missions Hayabusa and Hayabusa2. || 
|-id=822
| 15822 Genefahnestock ||  || Eugene G. Fahnestock (born 1980) has made seminal contributions to the dynamical study of binary asteroids. He was the first to investigate the fully coupled dynamics of a detailed binary asteroid system model using the radar-based shape models of 1999 KW4. || 
|-id=825
| 15825 Capecchi ||  || Mario Capecchi (born 1937), an Italian-born molecular geneticist, who was awareded with the 2007 Nobel Prize in Medicine for the discovery of "principles for introducing specific gene modifications in mice by the use of embryonic stem cells". || 
|-id=828
| 15828 Sincheskul || 1995 BS || Boris Fillipovich Sincheskul (born 1936), Ukrainian astronomer, has worked at the Poltava Gravimetric Observatory since 1962. He has observed lunar occultations for over 46 years and he was a pioneer in occultation astronomy in the Ukraine. || 
|-id=834
| 15834 McBride ||  || Neil McBride (born 1966) British astronomer who has worked on many aspects of solar system dynamics, including meteor stream formation, interrelations between minor planets, comets and meteors, as well as the structure of the trans-Neptunian region. || 
|-id=837
| 15837 Mariovalori ||  || Mario Valori (1930–2000) was an amateur astronomer in the Montelupo Group. || 
|-id=838
| 15838 Auclair ||  || Raymond Auclair, Canadian amateur astronomer † || 
|-id=840
| 15840 Hiroshiendou ||  || Hiroshi Endou (born 1939) is a confectionery manufacturer and amateur astronomer, active in the Nanyo Astronomy Lovers Club since 1983 || 
|-id=841
| 15841 Yamaguchi || 1995 OX || Yamaguchi prefecture, where the discoverer was born. || 
|-id=843
| 15843 Comcom ||  || Com Com is the science museum in Fukushima, Japan. || 
|-id=845
| 15845 Bambi ||  || Bambi, fictional young deer in Walt Disney's 1942 animated eponymous film || 
|-id=846
| 15846 Billfyfe ||  || William Fyfe (1927–2013), was a New Zealand-born Canadian geochemist at the University of Western Ontario, known for his research on the environmental implications of human energy consumption (Src). || 
|-id=849
| 15849 Billharper ||  || William Leonard Harper (born 1943) specializes in the philosophy of science. He earned a Ph.D. at the University of Rochester and has been in the department of philosophy at the University of Western Ontario since 1970. The name was suggested by R. Jedicke and P. Jedicke. || 
|-id=851
| 15851 Chrisfleming ||  || Christopher Edward John Fleming (born 1956) is a dedicated amateur astronomer, active in the Royal Astronomical Society of Canada, London Centre. As chair of the society's national observing committee, he has encouraged many new observers. The name was suggested by R. Jedicke and P. Jedicke. || 
|-id=853
| 15853 Benedettafoglia ||  || Benedetta Foglia (born 2006) is the second daughter of Sergio and Paola Diomede, friends of the discoverers. Benedetta is an amateur astronomer. || 
|-id=854
| 15854 Numa ||  || Numa Pompilius, second king of Rome, reigned from 715 to 672 B.C. || 
|-id=855
| 15855 Mariasalvatore ||  || Maria Salvatore (born 1963) is an enthusiast of small Solar System bodies, who has played a major role in promoting astronomy to the public. She has organized astronomical and scientific events, especially conferences and seminars for the study of asteroids. Name suggested by Claudio Casacci. || 
|-id=856
| 15856 Yanokoji || 1996 EL || Koji Yano (born 1964) is a Japanese amateur astronomer in Ehime Prefecture. A skilled photographer of nebula and star clusters, he is highly regarded for the superior technique. He is a member of the Oriental Astronomical Association. || 
|-id=857
| 15857 Touji ||  || Yasuo Touji (born 1949) is a Japanese amateur astronomer in Ishigakijima, Okinawa Prefecture, Japan. He is now the Chief director of a local astronomy club, "Yaeyama Hoshinokai", and contributes to the popularization of astronomy. || 
|-id=858
| 15858 Davidwoods ||  || David Woods (born 1959), a Scottish space historian. || 
|-id=860
| 15860 Siráň || 1996 HO || Gustáv Siráň (1934–2000), a Slovak geophysicist and former professor at Comenius University, Bratislava. From 1981 to 1989 he was head of the department of astronomy, geophysics and meteorology, and during this time the Astronomical and Geophysical Observatory in Modra was built. || 
|-id=861
| 15861 Ispahan ||  || Ispahan, Iran || 
|-id=868
| 15868 Akiyoshidai || 1996 OL || Akiyoshidai, located at the center of Yamaguchi prefecture, is the biggest karst plateau in Japan. || 
|-id=869
| 15869 Tullius || 1996 PL || Tullus Hostilius (reigned 673–642 BC), third king of Rome. He was a warrior king, and during the war against the city of Alba Longa there was a famous fight between Oratii and Curiatii. || 
|-id=870
| 15870 Obůrka || 1996 QD || Oto Obůrka (1909–1982), Czech astronomer and professor at Brno University of Technology, who founded the Nicholas Copernicus Observatory there and led it for 20 years. He established a program, aimed at young amateurs, for monitoring short-period variable stars. He was an honorary president of the International Union of Amateur Astronomers. || 
|-id=884
| 15884 Maspalomas || 1997 DJ || Maspalomas is a town in Gran Canaria Island, Spain. The Maspalomas Tracking Station of the Japan Aerospace Exploration Agency is located there to conduct command operations and receive telemetry from satellites that observe the earth and the moon || 
|-id=887
| 15887 Daveclark ||  || David Leslie Clark (born 1956) is an amateur astronomer active in the Royal Astronomical Society of Canada, London Centre, particularly in educational activities. He created ClearSky, a planetarium software package. The name was suggested by R. Jedicke and P. Jedicke. || 
|-id=889
| 15889 Xiaoyuhe ||  || Xiaoyu He (born 1994), 2012 Intel STS finalist. || 
|-id=890
| 15890 Prachatice || 1997 GY || Prachatice is a southern Bohemian town that began as a small settlement on the Golden Trail that had the rights to sell salt from Passau. The Prachatice of today, founded in the 14th century, is dominated by the Gothic Church of St. James. || 
|-id=891
| 15891 Alissazhang ||  || Alissa Yuan Zhang (born 1994), 2012 Intel STS finalist. || 
|-id=896
| 15896 Birkhoff ||  || George David Birkhoff (1884–1944) was one of the foremost American mathematicians of the early twentieth century. He made important contributions to ergodic theory, the topological theory of dynamical systems, ordinary differential equations and difference equations. || 
|-id=897
| 15897 Beňačková ||  || Gabriela Beňačková, Slovak soprano || 
|-id=898
| 15898 Kharasterteam || 1997 QP || The asteroid group at the Astronomical Observatory of Kharkiv National University has made important contributions to studies of the physical properties of minor planets. The group's photometric and polarimetric techniques, as well as its numerical and laboratory modeling, are known worldwide. || 
|-id=899
| 15899 Silvain ||  || Jacques Silvain (1926–1987) was an enthusiastic amateur astronomer. || 
|}

15901–16000 

|-id=902
| 15902 Dostál ||  || Víťa Dostál (born 1959), a Czech globetrotter who became a legend as the first person in his country to cycle alone 60~000 km around the world. He described the 1994–1997 adventure in Lucky Planet. A professional farmer, during 2006–2007 he made the Panamericana solo bike tour from Anchorage to Ushuaia in 223 days. || 
|-id=903
| 15903 Rolandflorrie ||  || Roland (1914–1999) and Florrie (1912–2000) Handley were the parents of the discoverer. || 
|-id=904
| 15904 Halstead ||  || Susan Ruth Halstead (born 1959) is the sister of the discoverer. || 
|-id=905
| 15905 Berthier ||  || Jérôme Berthier (born 1968) works on minor planets at the Institut de Mécanique Céleste in Paris. His main goal is to develop both accurate ephemerides and the reduction package PRIAM to predict stellar occultations by minor planets. || 
|-id=906
| 15906 Yoshikaneda ||  || Yosibumi Kaneda (born 1937), a retired teacher of high school, is an amateur astronomer, active in the Nanyo Astronomy Lovers Club since 1983 || 
|-id=907
| 15907 Robot ||  || Robot, word coined by Josef Čapek || 
|-id=908
| 15908 Bertoni ||  || Mosé Giacomo Bertoni (1857–1929), a Swiss-Paraguayan botanist, anthropologist and writer. || 
|-id=910
| 15910 Shinkamigoto ||  || Shinkamigoto is a town located in the north of the Goto Islands, a group of 140 islands located in the west of Nagasaki prefecture in southwest Japan || 
|-id=911
| 15911 Davidgauthier ||  || David Gauthier, philosopher. || 
|-id=913
| 15913 Telemachus ||  || Telemachus, Greek mythological figure. || 
|-id=916
| 15916 Shigeoyamada ||  || Shigeo Yamada (1942–2002), an aerospace engineer at the National Space Development Agency of Japan, managed the lunar explorer KAGUYA and the engineering test satellites ETS-VII. Generous and thoughtful, he devoted himself to working on NASDA projects until the "fuel" of his life was finally exhausted || 
|-id=917
| 15917 Rosahavel ||  || Josef Havel (1930–2008) was a significant personality in Czech rose breeding. A diligent and modest man, he detected and preserved several color mutations and obtained numerous awards in international rose contests, including the gold medal in Rome for Nette Ingeborg || 
|-id=918
| 15918 Thereluzia ||  || Theresia Luzia Ehring (born 1949) is the wife of the discoverer. || 
|-id=921
| 15921 Kintaikyo || 1997 VP || Kintaikyo is one of the three most famous bridges in Japan, known collectively as Sanmeikyo. || 
|-id=922
| 15922 Masajisaito || 1997 VR || Masaji Saito, Japanese architectural restorer, free-lance photographer and amateur astronomer || 
|-id=924
| 15924 Axelmartin ||  || Axel Martin (born 1968) is a longtime German amateur astronomer and co-founder of the Turtle Star Observatory. As a member of the VdS Fachgruppe "Kleine Planeten" he works on the astrometry and photometry of minor planets || 
|-id=925
| 15925 Rokycany ||  || Rokycany is a town in West Bohemia about which the first written evidence dates from 1110. In 1947 a public observatory was founded there, concentrating on occultation observations, work with youth, teachers and amateur telescope making || 
|-id=929
| 15929 Ericlinton ||  || Eric John Clinton (born 1955), an amateur astronomer active in the Royal Astronomical Society of Canada, London Centre. || 
|-id=938
| 15938 Bohnenblust ||  || :de:Frederic Bohnenblust (Henri Frederic Bohnenblust) (1906–2000), Swiss-born American mathematician. || 
|-id=939
| 15939 Fessenden ||  || Reginald Aubrey Fessenden (1866–1932) invented amplitude modulation as a means of transmitting sounds by radio. He was a professor at Purdue University and the University of Pittsburgh. || 
|-id=941
| 15941 Stevegauthier ||  || Steven Maurice Gauthier (born 1957), a Canadian amateur astronomer. || 
|-id=945
| 15945 Raymondavid ||  || Raymond David (born 1941), ski teacher by vocation and electronics specialist and amateur astronomer by avocation. || 
|-id=946
| 15946 Satinský ||  || Július Satinský, Slovak comedian † || 
|-id=947
| 15947 Milligan ||  || Spike Milligan (born 1918) is best known for his off-the-planet sense of humor in the groundbreaking BBC radio comedy series The Goon Show. || 
|-id=949
| 15949 Rhaeticus || 1998 BQ || Georg Joachim Rheticus (1514–1574) was an Austrian humanist, physician, mathematician and astronomer at the universities of Vienna, Leipzig and Wittenberg. He summarized and popularized the work of his teacher Copernicus, initiating the first printing of De Revolutionibus. || 
|-id=950
| 15950 Dallago ||  || Giovanni Dal Lago (born 1964), Vicenza amateur astronomer. || 
|-id=955
| 15955 Johannesgmunden ||  || Johannes von Gmunden, Austrian priest, humanist, mathematician and astronomer † || 
|-id=957
| 15957 Gemoore ||  || George Edward Moore, English philosopher. || 
|-id=960
| 15960 Hluboká || 1998 CH || Hluboká nad Vltavou, château in South Bohemia † || 
|-id=963
| 15963 Koeberl ||  || Christian Koeberl, Austrian professor of geochemistry and cosmochemistry || 
|-id=964
| 15964 Billgray || 1998 DU || Bill Gray (born 1965) has made several contributions to astrometry, in particular with his Guide series of starcharting software, his Charon astrometry program and his reduction of the GSC 1.1 star catalog to the ACT frame (GSC-ACT). || 
|-id=965
| 15965 Robertcox ||  || Robert E. Cox, American long time editor of Gleanings for ATMs (Amateur Telescope Makers) in Sky & Telescope magazine. || 
|-id=967
| 15967 Clairearmstrong ||  || Claire Armstrong, collaborator and wife of the discoverer, supernova hunter M. Armstrong || 
|-id=968
| 15968 Waltercugno ||  || Walter Cugno (born 1950) works in the Italian space industry. During his career, he developed projects for the International Space Station and space exploration. He supported satellite projects including Sax, Hipparcos and ExoMars. Name suggested by Ilaria Locantore. || 
|-id=969
| 15969 Charlesgreen ||  || Charles Green (1735–1771), British astronomer who was the official astronomer on Cook's expedition aboard the Endeavour to Tahiti to observe the 1769 transit of Venus. After the successful observation of the event, the expedition left Tahiti and sailed for Australia and Jakarta. In Batavia Green caught malaria and was buried at sea. || 
|-id=970
| 15970 Robertbrownlee ||  || Robert Brownlee (born 1924), an American astronomer. || 
|-id=971
| 15971 Hestroffer ||  || Daniel Hestroffer (born 1965), a French astronomer who works at the Institut de Mécanique Céleste in Paris on the determination of an inertial frame from the Hipparcos observations of minor planets. He has also worked on the determination of the shapes of minor planets. || 
|-id=986
| 15986 Fienga ||  || Agnes Fienga (born 1973), French astronomer who works at the Institut de Mécanique Céleste in Paris on the global adjustment of analytical theories of planetary motion to observations. She also worked on space navigation at CNES and JPL. || 
|-id=988
| 15988 Parini ||  || Eduardo Parini (born 1926), a Paraguayan amateur astronomer. || 
|-id=992
| 15992 Cynthia ||  || Cynthia Hug, the discoverer's wife; Cynthia is also an alternate name for the Moon goddess Artemis (from her birthplace, Mount Cynthus on Delos), and this minor planet was imaged many times with the Moon above the horizon || 
|-id=000
| 16000 Neilgehrels ||  || Neil Gehrels (1952–2017), was an American astrophysicist who has worked to develop gamma-ray astronomy into a full astronomical discipline. He is the Principal Investigator for the Swift Gamma-Ray Burst Mission (launched Nov. 2004) and was Project Scientist for the Compton Gamma Ray Observatory (1991–2000). His father was astronomer Tom Gehrels. || 
|}

References 

015001-016000